EuroChocolate is an annual chocolate festival that takes place in Perugia, the capital of the Umbria region in central Italy. The festival has been held since 1993, and is one of the largest chocolate festivals in Europe. EuroChocolate draws nearly one million tourists and Italian natives each year. It lasts for nine days and is located in the squares and areas of Piazza Italia, Piazza Della Repubblica, Corso Vannucci, Via Mazzini, Via Fani, The Terrace of the Covered Market, and Piazza IV Novembre.

Italy's most well-known chocolate company Perugina (now belonging to Nestlé), known for their Baci, is represented along with several other brands such as Lindt and Caffarel. EuroChocolate offers many snack and souvenir options such as chocolate-covered bananas, chocolate liqueur, chocolate moulds, and chocolate bricks.

EuroChocolate offers a variety of activities including chocolate art displays, experimental chocolate tastings, street performances, and chocolate sculpting. There is even an opportunity to make a chocolate day spa appointment. In 2003, the largest chocolate bar in the world was constructed.

EuroChocolate has extended to other Italian cities, such as Rome and Turin.

References

External links

a report about the festival

Food and drink festivals in Italy
Chocolate events
Perugia
Tourist attractions in Umbria
1993 establishments in Italy
Annual events in Italy
Cuisine of Umbria
Italian chocolate